Menasce Synagogue is a synagogue in Alexandria, Egypt in Ahmed Orabi Square.

History 
The synagogue was funded by the wealthy and powerful Menasce banking family of Alexandria, previously of Morocco and Palestine. The first member of the Menasce family in Egypt was Jacob Levi Menasce, born in Cairo in 1807, also known as Baron Jacob de Menasce. Menasce was elevated to the baronetcy by Austria-Hungarian Emperor Franz Josef when the emperor visited Egypt for the opening of the Suez Canal. Menasce later became president of the Cairo Jewish community. Menasce and his family moved in Alexandria in 1871 but developed a rift with the established Alexandrian Jewish community. The separate synagogue that he founded, the Menasce Synagogue, opened to great fanfare on December 30, 1872, with the ceremony attended by the Ottoman Governor of Alexandria. Although the Alexandria coastline was bombed ten years later in the Anglo-Egyptian War, the synagogue survived intact.

In September 2017, Menasce Synagogue was added to Egypt's list of Islamic, Jewish, and Coptic monuments, protecting it from being torn down.

See also
History of the Jews in Egypt
List of synagogues in Egypt

References

External links 
 Synagogues of Cairo and Alexandria from Diarna, the Geo-Museum of North African and Middle Eastern Jewish Life

Synagogues in Alexandria